Paul van den Berg (born 11 October 1936) is a former international Belgian footballer.

References
 
 Profile at Standard de Liège

1936 births
Living people
Belgian footballers
Belgium international footballers
Standard Liège players
R.S.C. Anderlecht players
Belgian Pro League players

Association football midfielders